The following is a list of hoverfly (Syrphidae) species recorded in New Zealand. This list is based on a list of New Zealand flower flies published by F. Christian Thompson in 2008. Currently the list consists of 37 endemic species, 1 native Oceanian species, and 5 introduced invasive species. Beyond this there are another 48 endemic species awaiting formal description.

Subfamily Syrphinae

Tribe Bacchini

Genus Melanostoma Schiner
 Melanostoma fasciatum (Macquart, 1850)

Genus Platycheirus Lepeletier & Serville

Subgenus Eocheilosia Hull
 Platycheirus antipodus (Hull, 1949)
 Platycheirus captalis (Miller, 1924)
 Platycheirus clarkei Miller, 1921
 Platycheirus cunninghami (Miller, 1921)
 Platycheirus fulvipes (Miller, 1924)
 Platycheirus harrisi (Miller, 1921)
 Platycheirus howesii (Miller, 1921)
 Platycheirus huttoni Thompson, 1989
 Platycheirus leptospermi (Miller, 1921)
 Platycheirus lignudus Miller, 1921
 Platycheirus myersii (Miller, 1924)
 Platycheirus notatus (Bigot, 1884)
 Platycheirus ronanus (Miller, 1921)

Tribe Syrphini

Genus Allograpta Osten Sacken
Allograpta atkinsoni (Miller, 1921)
Allograpta dorsalis (Miller, 1924)
Allograpta flavofaciens (Miller, 1921)
Allograpta hirsutifera (Hull, 1949)
Allograpta hudsoni (Miller, 1921)
Allograpta pseudoropala (Miller, 1921)
Allograpta ropala (Walker, 1849)
Allograpta ventralis (Miller, 1921)

Genus Anu Thompson
Anu una Thompson, 2008

Genus Melangyna Verrall

Subgenus: Austrosyrphus Vockeroth
Melangyna novaezelandiae (Macquart, 1855)

Genus Simosyrphus Bigot
Simosyrphus grandicornis (Macquart, 1842) – widespread in Oceania

Subfamily Eristalinae

Tribe Eristalini

Genus Helophilus Meigen

Subgenus: Pilinasica Malloch
Helophilus antipodus Schiner, 1868
Helophilus campbelli (Miller, 1921)
Helophilus campbellicus Hutton, 1902
Helophilus cargilli Miller, 1911
Helophilus chathamensis Hutton, 1901
Helophilus cingulatus (Fabricius, 1775)
Helophilus hectori Miller, 1924
Helophilus hochstetteri (Nowicki, 1875)
Helophilus ineptus Walker, 1849
Helophilus montanus (Miller, 1921)
Helophilus seelandicus (Gmelin, 1790)
Helophilus taruensis Miller, 1924

Genus Eristalinus Rondani
Eristalinus aeneus (Scopoli, 1763) – introduced

Genus Eristalis Latreille
Eristalis tenax (Linnaeus, 1758) – introduced

Tribe Merodontini

Genus Eumerus Meigen
Eumerus funeralis Meigen, 1822 – introduced
Eumerus strigatus (Fallen, 1817) – introduced

Genus Merodon Meigen
Merodon equestris (Fabricius, 1794) – introduced

Genus Psilota Meigen
Psilota decessa (Hutton, 1901)

Tribe Milesiini

Genus Orthoprosopa Macquart

Subgenus: Paratropidia Hull
Orthoprosopa bilineata (Walker, 1849)

References

 
Flower flies, New Zealand
List, New Zealand
Flower fly